Norfolk Island competed at the 2019 Pacific Games in Apia, Samoa from 7 to 20 July 2019. The country participated in six sports at the 2019 games.

Archery

Two male archers were selected to compete for Norfolk Island at the 2019 tournament:

Men
 Steven Baker
 Robert Kemp

Golf

Norfolk Island selected four male players for the 2019 tournament:

Men
 Thomas Greenwood
 Beau Magri
 Jared Magri
 Michael Sterling

Lawn bowls

Norfolk Island selected five men and five women to compete in lawn bowls at the 2019 games:

Men
 Gary Bigg
 Trevor Gow
 Phillip Jones
 Stephen Matthews
 Garry Ryan
 
Women
 Tessie Evans
 Christine Jones
 Patricia Snell
 Shae Wilson
 Tracey Wora

Netball

A squad of twelve players was selected for the Norfolk Island netball team at the 2019 games:

Women
 Candice Nobbs
 Michelle Dowling
 Emily Ryves
 Alana Christian
 Lara Bigg
 Erin Christian
 Rianna Christian
 Mareeva Evans
 Tahlia Evans
 Bekki Meers
 Kylie Sterling
 Paige Adams

Shooting

Norfolk Island selected six men to compete in shooting at the 2019 games:

Men
 Douglas Creek
 Kevin Coulter
 Andrew Barnett
 Michael Williams
 Dustin Menzies
 Brancker South

Squash

Norfolk Island selected four men to compete in squash at the 2019 games:

Men
 Nathaniel Kalsrap
 Marc Kalsrap
 Aidan Rowston
 Eamonn Kennerley

References

Nations at the 2019 Pacific Games
2019